Daniel Brélaz (born 4 January 1950, in Lausanne) is a Swiss mathematician and politician, member of the Green Party of Switzerland and mayor of Lausanne between 2001 and 2016.

In 1979, Daniel Brélaz became the first green representative elected to sit in a national parliament.

Biography 

Brélaz received a degree in mathematics from École polytechnique fédérale de Lausanne (EPFL) in 1975, and afterwards taught mathematics. He is responsible for a well-known approximation algorithm for graph colouring.

In 1975, he joined the Group for the Protection of the Environment in Lausanne. In 1978 he was one of the first environmentalists elected to parliament, in the Grand Council of Vaud, and re-elected in 1982–1983.
From 1979 to 1989, Brélaz was the first environmentalist elected to sit in a national parliament, in the National Council of Switzerland.

In 1989, he was elected to the City Council of Lausanne where he was responsible for industrial services. On 25 November 2001, he became the trustee responsible for finance, and was re-elected in the first round of Vaud elections on 12 March 2006.

In 2007, he was elected again to the National Council. He resigned his seat on the Grand Council of Vaud but remained a trustee in Lausanne, and was criticized for maintaining this dual mandate. On 13 March 2011, he was re-elected in the first round of the Lausanne municipal elections with 11,503 votes in his favour.

Brélaz was elected in 2015 Swiss federal election and re-elected in 2019.  A month after his election, he announced that he would retire from the National Council in 2022. His term officially ended on 17 February 2022 and was succeeded by Raphaël Mahaim. 

Brélaz is vice-president of the Administrative Council for Public Transportation in the Region of Lausanne.

References

Bibliography

External links 
 
 

Swiss mathematicians
Green Party of Switzerland politicians
Members of the National Council (Switzerland)
People from Lausanne
Mayors of Lausanne
1950 births
Living people
École Polytechnique Fédérale de Lausanne alumni